David Lowery (born December 26, 1980) is an American filmmaker.

His original work Ain't Them Bodies Saints (2013), starring Rooney Mara and Casey Affleck, was nominated for the Grand Jury Prize at the 2013 Sundance Film Festival. In 2016, he directed the Disney film Pete's Dragon (2016), a live-action film which he had co-written. It was a new work loosely based on the same original story as the Disney 1977 musical of the same name. In 2017, he directed the drama film A Ghost Story and in 2018, he directed The Old Man & the Gun. In 2021, he directed the fantasy epic The Green Knight.

Early life
Born in Milwaukee, Wisconsin, on December 26, 1980, David Lowery is the eldest of nine children born to Madeleine and Mark Lowery. When he was seven, his family moved to Irving, Texas for his father's work. Lowery attended Irving High School.

At the age of 19, Lowery wrote and directed his first film, a short entitled Lullaby.

Career
Lowery's first feature film, St. Nick, which follows two runaway children abandoned by their guardians, premiered at the 2009 South by Southwest festival. It won the Texas Filmmaker Award at the 2009 AFI Dallas International Film Festival.

In 2011, Lowery started his own production company, Sailor Bear. That same year, he wrote and directed the short film entitled Pioneer, which played at the Sundance Film Festival that year.

In 2013, Lowery wrote, directed and edited his second feature film, Ain't Them Bodies Saints, starring Casey Affleck and Rooney Mara. The film was nominated for the Grand Jury Prize at the 2013 Sundance Film Festival. It was selected to compete at the International Critics' Week section of the 2013 Cannes Film Festival. Lowery has said that he drew from great directors and their works for this film, citing Claire Denis's 35 Shots of Rum, Robert Altman's McCabe & Mrs. Miller, and Paul Thomas Anderson and David Fincher as influences.

In addition to having edited films such as Amy Seimetz's Sun Don't Shine and Shane Carruth's Upstream Color, Lowery co-wrote Pit Stop with director Yen Tan. At the 2014 Cannes Film Festival, it was announced that Lowery would write and direct the film adaptation of the novel The Yellow Birds, written by Iraq War veteran Kevin Powers; it was a 2012 National Book Award finalist. The film was eventually directed by Alexandre Moors and stars Jack Huston, Tye Sheridan, Alden Ehrenreich and Jennifer Aniston.

In April 2016, Lowery directed a remake of Disney's Pete's Dragon, which was met with positive reviews. Lowery also co-wrote the screenplay alongside Toby Halbrooks. In July 2016, it was announced Lowery would direct an episode of Breakthrough for National Geographic Channel. In November 2016, it was announced Lowery had shot a new film, A Ghost Story, over the summer with Rooney Mara and Casey Affleck as a secret project.

Lowery next directed the 2018 drama film The Old Man & the Gun, starring Robert Redford as bank robber, Forrest Tucker, and Casey Affleck.

Lowery next directed the medieval fantasy The Green Knight which stars Dev Patel, Alicia Vikander, Joel Edgerton, Barry Keoghan, Ralph Ineson and Sean Harris. The film was scheduled to world premiere at South by Southwest in March 2020, and release on May 29, 2020, but the premiere and release were cancelled due to the COVID-19 pandemic. It was released on July 30, 2021.

Lowery directed a segment of the anthology film The Year of the Everlasting Storm which premiered at the Cannes Film Festival in July 2021 and was released in theatres on 3 September 2021.

Personal life
Lowery married filmmaker Augustine Frizzell in 2010. , they live in Dallas. Lowery identifies as an atheist, and has been a vegan since approximately 1996.

Filmography

Film

Executive producer
 Minor Setback (2013)
 Person to Person (2017)
 Never Goin' Back (2018)
 Light from Light (2019)
 Miss Juneteenth (2020)
 We're All Going to the World's Fair (2022)

Short films

Additional credits

Acting roles

Television

References

External links

1980 births
Living people
American atheists
American cinematographers
American film editors
American male screenwriters
American film producers
Film directors from Texas
21st-century American male actors
Writers from Dallas